The 1929 Texas Tech Matadors football team represented Texas Technological College—now known as Texas Tech University—as an independent during the 1929 college football season. In their first and only season under head coach Grady Higginbotham, the Matadors compiled a 1–7–2 record and were outscored by opponents by a combined total of 141 to 31. The team played its home games at Tech Field.

Schedule

References

Texas Tech
Texas Tech Red Raiders football seasons
Texas Tech Matadors football